Boy Princess may refer to:

 Mimic Royal Princess, a 2011 manga whose Japanese title translates to "Boy Princess"
 Shounen Princess: Putri Harimau Naoko, a 2014 manga whose Japanese title translates to "Boy Princess"